Len Vautier (23 March 1909 – 7 July 1986) was an  Australian rules footballer who played with Geelong in the Victorian Football League (VFL).

Vautier retired at the age of 21 when he got a job with the State Electricity Commission of Victoria and relocated to Omeo, Victoria.  After twelve months he was back for one more season before retiring for good.

Notes

External links 

1909 births
1986 deaths
Australian rules footballers from Victoria (Australia)
Geelong Football Club players
North Geelong Football Club players